Scratch is a short film directed by Jakob Rørvik, and stars Viktoria Winge and Luke Treadaway.

Plot
Scratch follows Lena, an art student who is living in London. She searches for inspiration for her art project and finds it in Sol. He is a scruffy young man who drifts around, engaging in seemingly detached relationships with a variety of people. Lena begins to follow Sol, gaining a voyeur's perspective on the young man's life, and taking pictures of him when he is unaware. Things take a wrong turn when Sol discovers her. He is fascinated by her odd behaviour, and so Sol is now the one following her. The two form a strange relationship, gradually exposing each other's dreams, fears and lies.

Awards
In March 2010, Scratch won the Best Short Fiction award at the Aubagne Film Festival.

References

External links 
 
 BreakThru Films - Production Company

Norwegian short films
British short films
2010s English-language films